The 2016 European Amateur Team Championship took place 5–9 July at Golf de Chantilly, outside Paris, France.  It was the 33rd men's golf European Amateur Team Championship.

Venue 
The hosting club was founded in 1909. The Vineuil Course, situated in Chantilly, in the forest of the Hauts-de-France region of Northern France, 50 kilometres (30 miles) north of the center of Paris, close to the Château de Chantilly and Chantilly Racecourse, was originally designed by John Henry Taylor and later redesigned by Tom Simpson and Donald Steel.  It had previously hosted eleven editions of the Open de France, the first in 1913 and the latest in 1990.

The championship course was set up with par 71.

Format 
Each team consisted of six players, playing two rounds of an opening stroke-play qualifying competition over two days, counting the five best scores each day for each team.

The eight best teams formed flight A, in knock-out match-play over the next three days. The teams were seeded based on their positions after the stroke play. The first placed team was drawn to play the quarter final against the eight placed team, the second against the seventh, the third against the sixth and the fourth against the fifth. Teams were allowed to use six players during the team matches, selecting four of them in the two morning foursome games and five players in to the afternoon single games. Teams knocked out after the quarter finals played one foursome game and four single games in each of their remaining matches. Games all square at the 18th hole were declared halved, if the team match was already decided.

The eight teams placed 9–16 in the qualification stroke-play formed flight B, to play similar knock-out play, with one foursome game and four single games in each match, to decide their final positions.

Teams 
16 nation teams contested the event. Portugal, Austria and Norway qualified by finishing first, second and third at the 2015 Division 2. Each team consisted of six players.

Players in the participating teams

Winners 
Tied leaders of the opening 36-hole competition were host nation France and team Scotland, each with a 3-over-par score of 713. Team France earned first place on the tie breaking better non-counting scores. Eleven-time-winners England did not make it to the quarter finals, finishing tenth. Sweden, tied 12th after the first round, was close to miss the quarter finals, but finally, just like as at last year's championship, by a single stroke took the last place among the top eight teams. Sweden eventually came close to winning the championship.

There was no official award for the lowest individual score, but individual leader was Antoine Rozner, France, with a 6-under-par score of 136, one stroke ahead of John Axelsen, Denmark.

Defending champions team Scotland won the gold medal, earning their eighth title, beating team Sweden in the final 5–2. The final was decided when Scotland's 19-year-old, future European Tour winner, Robert McIntyre made a long putt for birdie on the 18th green in his single game against Sweden's Oskar Bergqvist.

Denmark earned the bronze on third place, after beating Italy 4–2 in the bronze match.

A second division, named European Amateur Championship Division 2, took place 6–9 July 2016 at Kikuoka GC, Luxembourg. The three best placed teams, Iceland, Wales and the Czech Republic, qualified for the 2017 European Amateur Team Championship.

The Netherlands, Portugal and Finland placed 14th, 15th and 16th in the first division and was moved to Division 2 for 2017.

Results 
Qualification round

Team standings

* Note: In the event of a tie the order was determined by thebest total of the two non-counting scores of the two rounds.

Individual leaders

Note: There was no official award for the lowest individual score.

Flight A

Bracket

Final games

* Note: Game declared halved, since team match already decided.

Flight B

Bracket

Final standings

Source:

See also 
 Eisenhower Trophy – biennial world amateur team golf championship for men organized by the International Golf Federation.
 European Ladies' Team Championship – European amateur team golf championship for women organised by the European Golf Association.

References

External links 
European Golf Association: Full results

European Amateur Team Championship
Golf tournaments in France
European Amateur Team Championship
European Amateur Team Championship
European Amateur Team Championship